The Spessart-Gymnasium Alzenau is a gymnasium (high school) in Alzenau, Bavaria. It is named after the Spessart, a wooded range of hills which stretches about 60 kilometers east of the town.

The gymnasium was founded 1962 to address the need for higher education in the prospering area. It was renovated and expanded in the late 1990s and now has a stationary telescope.

External links 
 Website des Spessart-Gymnasiums Alzenau

Schools in Bavaria
Educational institutions established in 1962
1962 establishments in West Germany